The 2020 Football Queensland season was the eight season since NPL Queensland commenced as the top tier of Queensland men’s football. This season was also the third season of the Football Queensland Premier League which occupied the second tier in Queensland men’s football in 2020.

Below NPL Queensland and the FQPL was a regional structure of ten zones with their own leagues. The strongest of the zones was Football Brisbane with its senior men’s competition consisting of four divisions.

The COVID-19 pandemic halted the season for a short period of time in all competitions, however all competitions in Queensland were completed.

League Tables

2020 National Premier Leagues Queensland
The NPL Premier normally qualifies for the national NPL finals series, but the 2020 National Premier Leagues finals series was cancelled in July.

Finals

2020 Football Queensland Premier League

Finals

2020 Brisbane Premier League
The 2020 Brisbane Premier League was the 38th edition of the Brisbane Premier League (the third level domestic association football competition in Queensland).

Cup Competitions

FFA Cup Qualifiers
Queensland-based soccer clubs commenced the 2020 FFA Cup preliminary rounds in February, only to see it suspended due to the impacts from the pandemic. At the time of suspension, only the first few rounds had been played or partially played. The competition was cancelled on 3 July.

References

Football Queensland season
Football Queensland seasons